Celeste (Celestia) West (November 24, 1942 – January 3, 2008) was an American librarian and lesbian author, known for her alternative viewpoints in librarianship and her authorship of books about lesbian sex and polyfidelity. She herself was polyamorous.

Biography
West was born in Pocatello, Idaho. She earned her BA in journalism from Portland State University, and her master's in Library Service from Rutgers University in 1968. She then moved to San Francisco, where she worked at the headquarters of the Bay Area Reference Center at the San Francisco Public Library. She was the second editor of its magazine, Synergy, which won two ALA awards but lost its funding in 1973 after West published an unflattering photograph of Richard Nixon.

In 1972, West co-founded Booklegger Press, the first woman-owned American library publisher, with her partner at the time, librarian Sue Critchfield, and Valerie Wheat. The press' first publication was an anthology edited by West and Elizabeth Katz entitled Revolting Librarians. The anthology, which described biases in contemporary library practices and proposed alternative library models, sold 15,000 copies in three years. She also published the feminist library journal Booklegger Magazine from 1973 through 1976. Between 1989 and 2006, West worked as the library director at the San Francisco Zen Center.

In 1977, West became an associate of the Women's Institute for Freedom of the Press (WIFP). WIFP is an American nonprofit publishing organization. The organization works to increase communication between women and connect the public with forms of women-based media.

Partial bibliography
Revolting Librarians (editor, 1972)
Women's Films in Print (1975)
Positive Images: Non-Sexist Films for Young People (1976)
The Passionate Perils of Publishing (1978)
The Public Library Mission Statement and Its Imperatives for Service (1979)
Where Have All the Publishers Gone? (1980)
Book of Lesbian Etiquette (1985)
Words in Our Pockets (1985)
Elsa: I Come With My Songs (editor of the autobiography of Elsa Gidlow, 1986)
A Lesbian Love Advisor (illustrated by Nicole Ferentz, 1989)
Lesbian Polyfidelity (illustrated by Nicole Ferentz, 1996)

References

1942 births
2008 deaths
American librarians
American women librarians
American lesbian writers
People from Pocatello, Idaho
Rutgers University alumni
Polyamory
Portland State University alumni
20th-century American writers
20th-century American women writers
Polyamorous people
LGBT people from Idaho
20th-century American LGBT people
21st-century American LGBT people
21st-century American women writers